The Medical Area Total Energy Plant, in Boston, Massachusetts, is a gas-fired co-generation power plant providing steam, chilled water, and electricity to the Longwood Medical Area.

Proposed in 1974 and completed in 1986, the facility encountered fierce community opposition and cost $350million$310million more than the originally projected $40 million.

References

Sources

1986 establishments in Massachusetts
Buildings and structures completed in 1986
Buildings and structures in Brookline, Massachusetts
Infrastructure in Boston
Power stations in Massachusetts
Natural gas-fired power stations in the United States